The Southern pygmy blindfish (Dactylosurculus gomoni) is a species of viviparous brotula, the only known member of its genus, found in the waters of the Indian Ocean off the coast of western Australia.  This species grows to a length of  SL. The specific name honours Martin F. Gomon, who was the senior curator of fishes at the Museum of Victoria in Melbourne, for his numerous contributions to the ichthyology of Australia.

References

Bythitidae
Monotypic fish genera
Fish described in 2007